Strange Justice is a 1999 American political drama television film directed by Ernest Dickerson, written by Jacob Epstein, and starring Delroy Lindo, Mandy Patinkin, Regina Taylor, and Paul Winfield. The film is based on the 1994 non-fiction book of the same name by Jane Mayer and Jill Abramson that covered the Clarence Thomas Supreme Court nomination. It aired on Showtime on August 29, 1999.

Synopsis
Strange Justice is based on events regarding the sexual harassment accusation brought by Anita Hill (Regina Taylor) during the Senate confirmation hearings of Clarence Thomas (Delroy Lindo) for the United States Supreme Court during the George H. W. Bush presidential administration.

Cast
 Delroy Lindo as Clarence Thomas
 Mandy Patinkin as Kenneth Duberstein
 Regina Taylor as Anita Hill
 Paul Winfield as Thurgood Marshall
 Louis Gossett Jr. as Vernon Jordan
 Stephen Young as Sen. Danforth
 Phillip Shepherd as Charles Goodman
 Mimi Kuzyk as Marion Gray
 Sherry Miller as Susan Deller Ross
 Julie Khaner as Julie Desavia
 Leila Johnson as Karen Hall
 Janet Land as Ginni Lamp Thomas
 Lisa Mende as Shirley Wiegand
 Karen Glave as Sondra Norris
 Barclay Hope as Tom Daniels
 Kathleen Laskey as Sydney Duberstein
 Maxine Guess as Angela Wright
 Richard Blackburn as John Sununu
 Bob Clout as A. B. Culvahouse
 Richard Fitzpatrick as Boyden Gray
 Fred Caplan as Chief Justice Rehnquist
 Panou as Gary Lee
 Barry Hirsch as Mike Gendler
 Sandi Stahlbrand as Jessica Gendler
 Philip Akin as Charles Ogletree
 Philip Craig as George Mitchell
 Caroly Larson as Andrea Sheldon
 David Kirby as Jerry Barrels
 Barry Flatman as Agent Allard

Production
The film was shot on location in Los Angeles and Toronto.

Awards and nominations

See also
 Confirmation (2016)

References

External links
 
 
 Jump Cut commentary

1999 television films
1999 films
1999 drama films
1990s American films
1990s English-language films
1990s legal drama films
1990s political drama films
American courtroom films
American drama television films
American films based on actual events
American legal drama films
American political drama films
Cultural depictions of judges
Cultural depictions of lawyers
Drama films based on actual events
Films about sexual harassment
Films based on non-fiction books
Films directed by Ernest Dickerson
Films set in 1991
Films set in Washington, D.C.
Films shot in Los Angeles
Films shot in Toronto
Paramount Pictures films
Peabody Award-winning broadcasts
Political films based on actual events
Showtime (TV network) films
Television films based on actual events
Television films based on books